Bende can refer to:
 Bende people, ethnic group in Tanzania
 Bende language, dialect of Tongwe language
 Bende, Nigeria, Local Government Area in Abia, Nigeria
 Bende, sub-municipality of Durbuy, Belgium